

See also
 Light emitting polymers in OLEDs
 Conductive polymer
 Electroluminescence

References

Organic polymers
Conductive polymers
Conjugated polymers